Bernard George Kobena Brako, known professionally as Ben Brako (born 20 May 1952), is a Ghanaian highlife artiste. He rose to prominence in the mid- to late 1980s, with the release of his first solo studio album, Baya, which he also produced and wrote, in 1987.

Early life
Brako was born on 20 May 1952 in Accra, Ghana, but grew up in his mother's native Cape Coast with his seven siblings. He took an active interest in the music and entertainment world at a very young age, but took his formal education very seriously. Brako began performing for live crowds in 1960, and in his own words he has "been performing ever since..."

Education
Brako had his secondary education at St Augustine's College in Cape Coast. He holds a Bachelor of Science degree in Agric Economics from the University of Ghana, and he also obtained and BA (Hons) in Media Communication Studies from the University of East London (1994).

Achievements 
Brako's single titled "Shame and Scandal" topped the Global Music Charts at number 1.

References

Ghanaian highlife musicians
Living people
1952 births
St. Augustine's College (Cape Coast) alumni